The 1964 United States presidential election in West Virginia took place on November 3, 1964, as part of the 1964 United States presidential election. West Virginia voters chose seven representatives, or electors, to the Electoral College, who voted for president and vice president.

 West Virginia was won by incumbent President Lyndon B. Johnson (D–Texas), with 67.94 percent of the popular vote, against Senator Barry Goldwater (R–Arizona), with 32.06 percent of the popular vote.

In a state where Goldwater was widely perceived as an extremist and excessively allied with the Deep South, and where Johnson’s campaign’s presentation of his Republican opponent as a warmonger who would provoke nuclear war had particular resonance in an isolationist Appalachian population, the incumbent President’s 67.94 percent vote share and 538,087-vote total are the highest percentage and vote count ever received by a Democratic presidential candidate in the state's history. West Virginia would be easily Johnson’s strongest antebellum slave state and his sixth-best overall behind Rhode Island, Hawaii, Massachusetts, Maine and New York, voting overall 13.29 percentage points more Democratic than the nation at-large even in a huge landslide.

, this is the only election since the Civil War in which a Democratic presidential candidate won Preston County and Upshur County. It is also the last occasion when Berkeley County, Wood County, and Doddridge County backed a Democrat for President.

This also remains the last time that West Virginia and neighboring  Virginia would simultaneously vote Democratic at the presidential level. 

West Virginia was also Johnson’s best state in the post-1996 “red wall” comprising states that have consistently voted Republican since 2000.

Results

Results by county

References

West Virginia
1964
1964 West Virginia elections